The 1901 All-Ireland Senior Hurling Championship Final was the 14th All-Ireland final and the culmination of the 1901 All-Ireland Senior Hurling Championship, an inter-county hurling tournament for the top teams in Ireland. The match was held at Jones' Road, Dublin, on 2 August 1903 between London, represented by a selection of clubs, and Cork, represented by Redmond's. The Munster champions lost to their London opponents on a score line of 1-5 to 0-4.

Match details

1
All-Ireland Senior Hurling Championship Finals
Cork county hurling team matches
London GAA matches
August 1903 sports events